The 1925 Virginia gubernatorial election was held on November 3, 1925, to elect the governor of Virginia.

Incumbent Governor Elbert Lee Trinkle, Democrat was ineligible to run for re-election due to term limits.

The Democratic Nominee, State Senator Harry F. Byrd defeated the Republican Nominee, former State Delegate Samuel H. Hoge.

Democratic Primary

Candidates 

 Harry F. Byrd, State Senator
 G. Walter Mapp, State Senator

Results

General Election

Candidates 

 Harry F. Byrd, State Senator (D)
 Samuel H. Hoge, Former State Delegate (R)

References

1925
Virginia
gubernatorial
November 1925 events